Paustian is a German language surname. It stems from the male given name Sebastian – and may refer to:
Ole Paustian (1937), Danish rower
Peter Paustian, German rower
Ross Paustian (1956),  American politician

References 

German-language surnames
Surnames from given names